The California Department of Finance is a state cabinet-level agency within the government of California. The Department of Finance is responsible for preparing, explaining, and administering the state's annual financial plan, which the Governor of California is required under the California Constitution to present by January 10 of each year to the general public. The Department of Finance's other duties include analyzing the budgets of proposed laws in the California State Legislature, creating and monitoring current and future economic forecasts of the state, estimating population demographics and enrollment projections, and maintaining the state's accounting and financial reporting systems.

The current director of finance is Joe Stephenshaw and is a member of Governor Gavin Newsom's cabinet. Stephenshaw was appointed the department's director in July 2022 by  Governor Newsom.

Units within the department 

There are nine financial units within the Department of Finance, administering the agency's various duties within the state government:

 Budget Operations Support (BOS)
 Legislative Analyses
 California State Accounting and Reporting System (CALSTARS): Accounting
 Demographic Research Unit (DRU)
 Economic/Financial Research Unit (ER/FR)
 Fiscal Systems and Consulting Unit (FSCU)
 Office of State Audits and Evaluations (OSAE)
 Performance Review Unit (PRU)
 Financial Information System for California (FI$Cal) Project

See also 

 Economy of California
 California State Treasurer
 California State Controller

References

External links 
 
 Investment in the California Code of Regulations
 Department of Finance's Population Estimate Methodology
 2014-2015 Proposed California Budget

Finance
Organizations based in Sacramento, California